The MainOne (铭万) Power Rider SL-250 is a Motor scooter. It is Chinese in make and has a sister model called the DL-250. It is powered by two 24 V / 7 Ah (UL, CE) batteries in series.
It features folding handle bars.

SL-250 And Sister model DL-250 

There are a few differences between the two; here are some major differences:

Specifications 
The SL-250 has a 250 watt DC motor that can propel it up to 14 mph. It stands 40 inches tall, 40 inches long, and 12 inches wide. It holds two 24 V / 7 Ah (UL, CE) batteries in series. The batteries last 10-15.5 miles on a 5-hour charge. It rides on Rubber Pneumatic tires (8"). It features a head light, turn signals, horn, key switch, volt meter, variable speed throttle, folding handle bars. It costs around $550.00-$650.00.

Footnotes 

Motor scooters